Ernst Unger (April 2, 1875, in Berlin – September 13, 1938, in Prenzlau) was a German physician and surgeon, who was regarded as a pioneer in kidney transplantation. He also set up one of the first blood donation services in Germany in 1932.

References 

1875 births
1938 deaths
German physicians